Eşen River is a river in south west Turkey.  - river flows mostly in Muğla Province. It flows in the middle of Seydikemer ilçe (district) of Muğla Province. The river although quite short is known for its touristic importance. 

In the antiquity the river as well as the ancient city by the river was known as Xanthos. Both Patara and Letoon are nearby. Currently visitors enjoy rafting in the lower course of the river which draws the border line between Muğla and Antalya Provinces.

Gallery

References

Rivers of Turkey
Muğla Province
Rafting